Cape Vera is an uninhabited headland on Devon Island, in the Qikiqtaaluk Region of Nunavut, Canada. Protruding off the island's northwestern Colin Archer Peninsula, it faces Jones Sound. Often, a polynya forms in the Cardigan Strait, a waterway that separates the cape from North Kent Island.

Geography

Fauna
The cape is notable as a Canadian Important Bird Area (#NU053), an International Biological Program site (Region 9, #2-11) and a Key Migratory Bird Terrestrial Habitat site. Notable bird species include the northern fulmar and common eider. Colonial seabirds are also attracted to this remote, High Arctic site.

History
Archeological sites have been found near the base of the cape.

References

 Cape Vera at Atlas of Canada

Peninsulas of Qikiqtaaluk Region
Important Bird Areas of Qikiqtaaluk Region
Important Bird Areas of Arctic islands
Seabird colonies
Vera